The following outline is provided as an overview of and topical guide to the U.S. state of Illinois:

Illinois – fifth most populous of the 50 states of the United States of America. Illinois lies between Lake Michigan and the Mississippi River and the Ohio River in the Midwestern United States. Chicago, Illinois, is the third most populous city and the third most populous metropolitan area of the United States. The United States created the Illinois Territory on March 1, 1809. Illinois joined the Union as the 21st state on December 3, 1818.

General reference 

 Names
 Common name: Illinois
 Pronunciation:  
 Official name: State of Illinois
 Abbreviations and name codes
 Postal symbol:  IL
 ISO 3166-2 code:  US-IL
 Internet second-level domain:  .il.us
 Nicknames
 Land of Lincoln (currently used on license plates)
 Prairie State
 Corn State
 Inland Empire State
 Sucker State (possibly named for a type of fish)
 Garden of the West
 Baja Wisconsin
 Adjectival: Illinois
 Demonym: Illinoisan

Geography of Illinois 

Geography of Illinois
 Illinois is: a U.S. state, a federal state of the United States of America
 Location
 Northern hemisphere
 Western hemisphere
 Americas
 North America
 Anglo America
 Northern America
 United States of America
 Contiguous United States
 Central United States
 Corn Belt
 East North Central States
 Midwestern United States
 Great Lakes Region
 Population of Illinois: 12,830,632 (2010 U.S. Census)
 Area of Illinois: , 25th of the 50 states.
 Atlas of Illinois

Places in Illinois 

 Historic places in Illinois
 Ghost towns in Illinois
 National Historic Landmarks in Illinois
 National Register of Historic Places listings in Illinois
 Bridges on the National Register of Historic Places in Illinois
 National Natural Landmarks in Illinois
 National parks in Illinois
 State parks in Illinois

Environment of Illinois 

 Climate of Illinois
 Geology of Illinois
 Environment ecoregions of Illinois 
 Protected areas in Illinois
 Nature centers in Illinois
 State forests of Illinois
 Superfund sites in Illinois
 Wildlife of Illinois
 Fauna of Illinois
 Birds of Illinois

Natural geographic features of Illinois 

 Lakes of Illinois
 Rivers of Illinois

Regions of Illinois 

Regions of Illinois
 Central Illinois
 Eastern Illinois
 Northern Illinois
 Northwestern Illinois
 Southern Illinois
 Southeastern Illinois
 Forgottonia (Western Illinois)

Administrative divisions of Illinois 

 The 102 counties of the state of Illinois
 Municipalities in Illinois
 Cities in Illinois
 State capital of Illinois:
 City nicknames in Illinois
 Towns in Illinois
 Unincorporated communities in Illinois
 Census-designated places in Illinois

Demography of Illinois 

Demographics of Illinois

Government and politics of Illinois 

Politics of Illinois
 Form of government: U.S. state government
 United States congressional delegations from Illinois
 Illinois State Capitol
 Elections in Illinois
 Electoral reform in Illinois
 Political party strength in Illinois

Branches of the government of Illinois 

Government of Illinois

Executive branch of the government of Illinois 
 Governor of Illinois
 Lieutenant Governor of Illinois
 Illinois Secretary of State
 Illinois Treasurer
 State departments
 Illinois Department of Transportation

Legislative branch of the government of Illinois 

 Illinois General Assembly (bicameral)
 Upper house: Illinois Senate
 Lower house: Illinois House of Representatives

Judicial branch of the government of Illinois 

Courts of Illinois
 Supreme Court of Illinois

Law and order in Illinois 

Law of Illinois
 Cannabis in Illinois
 Capital punishment in Illinois
 Individuals executed in Illinois
 Illinois Constitution
 Crime in Illinois
 Gun laws in Illinois
 Law enforcement in Illinois
 Law enforcement agencies in Illinois
 Illinois State Police
 Same-sex marriage in Illinois

Military in Illinois 

 Illinois Air National Guard
 Illinois Army National Guard
 List of United States military bases in Illinois

History of Illinois

History of Illinois

History of Illinois, by period 

Prehistory of Illinois
Indigenous peoples
Mississippian culture
Cahokia
French colony of Louisiane, 1699–1763; Upper Louisiana was called Illinois Country. 
Treaty of Paris of 1763
British (though predominantly Francophone) Province of Quebec, (1763–1783)-1791
American Revolutionary War, April 19, 1775 – September 3, 1783
United States Declaration of Independence, July 4, 1776
Illinois campaign, July 1778 – February 1779
Treaty of Paris, September 3, 1783
Unorganized territory of the United States, 1783–1787
Territory Northwest of the River Ohio, (1787–1800)-1803
Territory of Indiana, (1800–1809)-1816
Territory of Illinois, 1809–1818
Peoria War, 1813
State of Illinois becomes 21st State admitted to the United States of America on December 3, 1818
Black Hawk War, 1832
Abraham Lincoln becomes 16th President of the United States on March 4, 1861
American Civil War, April 12, 1861 – May 13, 1865
Illinois in the American Civil War
Assassination of President Abraham Lincoln in Washington, D.C. on April 14, 1865
President Lincoln dies in Washington, D.C. on April 15, 1865
Ulysses S. Grant becomes 18th President of the United States on March 4, 1869
Ronald Reagan becomes 40th President of the United States on January 20, 1981

History of Illinois, by region 
 By city
 History of Chicago
 History of Nauvoo, Illinois
 History of Peoria, Illinois

History of Illinois, by subject 
 Museums in Illinois

Culture of Illinois 

Culture of Illinois
 Museums in Illinois
 Religion in Illinois
 Episcopal Diocese of Chicago
 Scouting in Illinois
 List of Illinois state symbols
 Flag of Illinois 
 Seal of Illinois

The Arts in Illinois 
 Music of Illinois
 Theater in Illinois

Sports in Illinois 

Sports in Illinois
 Professional sports teams in Illinois

Economy and infrastructure of Illinois 

Economy of Illinois
 Communications in Illinois
 Newspapers in Illinois
 Radio stations in Illinois
 Television stations in Illinois
 Energy in Illinois
 Power stations in Illinois
 Solar power in Illinois
 Wind power in Illinois
 Health care in Illinois
 Hospitals in Illinois
 Transportation in Illinois
 Airports in Illinois
 Railroads in Illinois
 Roads in Illinois
 Illinois Routes (State highways)
 Interstate Highways in Illinois

Education in Illinois 

Education in Illinois
 Schools in Illinois
 School districts in Illinois
 High schools in Illinois
 Colleges and universities in Illinois
 University of Illinois system
 Illinois State University

See also

Topic overview:
Illinois

Index of Illinois-related articles

References

External links 

Illinois
 
Illinois
Illinois